Manawatu (often known as the Manawatu Turbos) are a New Zealand professional rugby union team based in Palmerston North, New Zealand. The union was originally established in 1886, with the National Provincial Championship established in 1976. They now play in the reformed National Provincial Championship competition. They play their home games at Central Energy Trust Arena in Palmerston North in the Manawatū-Whanganui region. The team is affiliated with the Hurricanes Super Rugby franchise. Their home playing colours are green and white.

Current squad

The Manawatu Turbos squad for the 2022 Bunnings NPC:

Honours

Manawatu have been overall Champions on one occasion, winning the title in 1980. Their full list of honours include:

National Provincial Championship First Division
Winners: 1980

ITM Cup Championship Division
Winners: 2014

Current Super Rugby players
Players named in the 2022 Manawatu Turbos squad, who also earned contracts or were named in a squad for any side participating in the 2022 Super Rugby Pacific season.

References

External links
 Official Site

National Provincial Championship
New Zealand rugby union teams
Sport in Manawatū-Whanganui
Sport in Palmerston North